Syed Nazmul Haque, (1941 – 14 December 1971) born in the district of Khulna, was a martyred Bengali journalist.

Education and career
Syed Nazmul Haque passed B.A. (Hons) and M.A. in political science from Dhaka University in 1963 and 1964 respectively. He took active part in the anti-martial law movement in 1962. He was arrested for disrupting the convocation program on the DU campus in 1964 where the then governor of East Pakistan Abdul Monem Khan was present. He passed the superior service examination in 1967 and was selected for the information service. But because of the police case against him for disrupting the convocation he was not allowed to join the service.

He later took up journalism as a full-time profession. He became the chief reporter of Pakistan Press International and Dhaka correspondent of Columbia Broadcasting Service. He prepared a full report on the proceedings of Agartala Conspiracy Case. He sent news items on the atrocities carried out by the Pakistani forces during the liberation war of Bangladesh. On 6 August 1971 he was arrested in Dhaka and sent to a prison in West Pakistan. He was given pressure to testify against Sheikh Mujibur Rahman in a secret trial. On getting release in November 1971 he came back to Dhaka.

Death
On 11 December 1971, he was picked up from his Purana Paltan house by the members of Al-Badr. His dead body was never found.

On 3 November 2013, Chowdhury Mueen-Uddin, a Muslim leader based in London, and Ashrafuz Zaman Khan, based in the US, were sentenced in absentia after the court found that they were involved in the abduction and murders of 18 people – six journalists including  Syed Nazmul Haque, nine Dhaka University teachers and three physicians – in December 1971.

See also
 1971 Bangladesh atrocities

References

1941 births
1971 deaths
Bangladeshi murder victims
University of Dhaka alumni
People murdered in Bangladesh
People killed in the Bangladesh Liberation War